Rolling Stones Museum may refer to:
 The Rolling Stones Museum, a museum in Slovenia on the rock band The Rolling Stones
 Stones Fan Museum, a museum in Germany on the rock band The Rolling Stones